Ri Chon-il (born 22 January 1991) is a North Korean former footballer. He represented North Korea on at least one occasion in 2015.

Career statistics

International

References

1991 births
Living people
Sportspeople from Pyongyang
North Korean footballers
North Korea international footballers
Association football defenders
Sobaeksu Sports Club players